was a Japanese poet, historian, and Buddhist monk.

Biography
Jien was the son of Fujiwara no Tadamichi, a member of the Fujiwara clan of powerful aristocrats. His brother was the future regent Fujiwara no Kanezane. Jien became a Tendai monk early in his life, entering Shōren-in at age eleven. He first took the Buddhist name Dokaei, and later changed it to Jien.

Jien eventually began to study and write Japanese history, his purpose being to "enlighten people who find it hard to understand the vicissitudes of life". His masterpiece, completed around 1220, was humbly entitled Gukanshō, which translates as Jottings of a Fool. In it he tried to analyze the facts of Japanese history. The Gukanshō held a mappo and therefore pessimistic view of his age, the Feudal Period, and claimed that it was a period of religious decline and saw the disintegration of civilization. This is the viewpoint generally held today. Jien claimed that changes in the feudal structure were necessary and defended the shōguns claim of power.

Poetry 
As a poet, he was named one of the Thirty-Six Immortals of Poetry, and was the second-best represented poet in the Shin Kokin Wakashū. He was included by Fujiwara no Teika in the Ogura Hyakunin Isshu. 

In The Unfettered Mind the Zen Buddhist Takuan Sōhō cites the following poem from Jien, interpreting it in the context of No-Mind:

The flower that would surrender its fragrance

before my brushwood door

Does so regardless.

I, however, sit and stare

How rueful this world.

See also
Kankyo no Tomo, a collection of setsuwa formerly attributed to Jien

References

Bibliography
 Brown, Delmer and Ichiro Ishida, eds. (1979). [Jien (1221)], Gukanshō; "The Future and the Past: a translation and study of the 'Gukanshō', an interpretive history of Japan written in 1219" translated from the Japanese and edited by Delmer M. Brown & Ichirō Ishida. Berkeley: University of California Press.  
 Encyclopædia Britannica 2005 Ultimate Reference Suite DVD, article "Jien"
 Mostow, Joshua S., (1996) Pictures of the Heart: The Hyakunin Isshu in Word and Image, pp. 421–422
 Robert, Jean-Noël (2008). La Centurie du Lotus: Poèmes de Jien (1155–1225) sur le Sûtra du Lotus; Paris: Collège de France, Institut des hautes études japonaises.  
 Swanson, Eric Haruki. (2019). The Restoration of Peace Through the Pacification of Vengeful Spirits: Jien (1155-1225) and the Construction of Buddhist Orthodoxy. Doctoral dissertation, Harvard University, Graduate School of Arts & Sciences. http://nrs.harvard.edu/urn-3:HUL.InstRepos:42029681 

1155 births
1225 deaths
Japanese poets
Japanese Buddhist clergy
People of Heian-period Japan
People of Kamakura-period Japan
13th-century Buddhists
Hyakunin Isshu poets
Heian period Buddhist clergy
Kamakura period Buddhist clergy
Buddhist poets
13th-century Japanese historians